Indian Creek Valley Trail is a Pennsylvania rail-trail in northeast Fayette and southeast Westmoreland Counties about 50 miles southeast of Pittsburgh. The Saltlick Township-owned Section (6 miles) opened in 1989, where the trail traverses Indian Creek along the former  Indian Creek Valley Railroad (ICVRR). The second phase (1.5 miles) opened in 2009, and is in Donegal Township; however, it is owned by the Mountain Watershed Association. Plans call to extend the trail further in the future.

Trailheads and facilities 
Listed below are facilities north to south.

References 

Protected areas of Fayette County, Pennsylvania
Protected areas of Westmoreland County, Pennsylvania
Rail trails in Pennsylvania